"The Stuff That Dreams Are Made Of" is the third single from Carly Simon's 13th studio album Coming Around Again (1987). The song was written by Simon and produced by John Boylan. Though no official video was produced for the single, a clip of Simon performing the song at her 1987 HBO concert special, Live from Martha's Vineyard, was released.

The song is one of Simon's biggest Adult contemporary hits, and has been included on multiple compilations of her work, such as the three-disc box set Clouds in My Coffee (1995), the UK import The Very Best of Carly Simon: Nobody Does It Better (1998), the two-disc retrospective Anthology (2002), the single-disc Reflections: Carly Simon's Greatest Hits (2004), and Sony Music's Playlist: The Very Best of Carly Simon (2014).

The song title is derived from the line of 1941 Warner Bros. film, The Maltese Falcon.

Reception
"The Stuff That Dreams Are Made Of" peaked at No. 8 on the Billboard Adult Contemporary chart, where it charted for 17 weeks. The song also charted in Ireland, peaking at No. 28.

Track listings and formats
7" single (US)
 "The Stuff That Dreams Are Made Of" (Single version) – 4:20
 "As Time Goes By" – 5:06

7" single (UK)
 "The Stuff That Dreams Are Made Of" – 3:58
 "As Time Goes By" – 5:06

Personnel 
 Carly Simon – lead vocals, Yamaha DX7
 Rob Mounsey – acoustic piano, keyboard bass, string arrangements and conductor 
 Jimmy Ryan – guitars 
 Russ Kunkel – drums, drum machine 
 David Nadien – concertmaster 
 Timothy Wright Concert Choir – choir

Charts

References

External links
Carly Simon's Official Website

1987 singles
Carly Simon songs
Songs written by Carly Simon
Pop ballads
1987 songs
Arista Records singles